Romanones is a municipality  of Spain located in the province of Guadalajara, Castilla–La Mancha. The municipality has a total area of 28.88 km2. As of 1 January 2019, it has a registered population of 99 inhabitants.

See also 
  List of municipalities in Guadalajara

References

Municipalities in the Province of Guadalajara